Domenico Bova (22 November 1946 – 9 July 2019) was an Italian politician who served as a Deputy between 1994 and 2006.

References

People from the Province of Reggio Calabria
2019 deaths
Deputies of Legislature XII of the Kingdom of Italy
Deputies of Legislature XIII of Italy
Deputies of Legislature XIV of Italy
Democratic Party of the Left politicians
Democrats of the Left politicians
1946 births